KTEQ may refer to:

 KTEQ-FM, a radio station (91.3 FM) licensed to serve Rapid City, South Dakota, United States
 KTEQ-LP, a low-power television station (channel 11) licensed to serve Hope, Arkansas, United States